Helmut Gröttrup (12 February 1916 – 4 July 1981) was a German engineer, rocket scientist and inventor of the smart card. During World War II, he worked in the German V-2 rocket program under Wernher von Braun. From 1946 to 1950 he headed a group of 170 German scientists who were forced to work for the Soviet rocketry program under Sergei Korolev. After returning to West Germany in December 1953, he developed data processing systems and contributed to early commercial applications of computer science. In 1967 Gröttrup invented the basic principles of the smart card as a forgery-proof "key" for secure identification and access control.

Education
Helmut Gröttrup's father Johann Gröttrup (1881 – 1940) was a mechanical engineer. He worked full-time at the Bund der technischen Angestellten und Beamten (Butab), a federation for technical staff and officials of the social democratic trade union in Berlin. His mother Thérèse Gröttrup (1894 – 1981), born Elsen, was active in the peace movement. Johann Gröttrup lost his job in 1933 when the Nazi Party came into power.

From 1935 to 1939 Helmut Gröttrup studied applied physics at the Technical University of Berlin and made his thesis with professor Hans Geiger, the co-inventor of the Geiger counter. He also worked for Manfred von Ardenne's research laboratory Forschungslaboratorium für Elektronenphysik.

German rocketry program
From December 1939, Helmut Gröttrup worked in the German V-2 rocket program at the Peenemünde Army Research Center with Walter Dornberger and Wernher von Braun. In December 1940, he was made department head under Ernst Steinhoff for developing remote guidance and control systems.

Since October 1943 Gröttrup had been under SD surveillance. A report stated that he, his wife Irmgard, Wernher von Braun, and his colleague Klaus Riedel were said to have expressed regret at an engineer's house one evening that they were not working on a spaceship and that they felt the war was not going well; this was considered a "defeatist" attitude. A young female dentist who was an SS spy reported their comments. Combined with Himmler's false charges that they were communist sympathizers and had attempted to sabotage the V-2 program, the Gestapo detained them on March 21, 1944, and took them to a Gestapo cell in Stettin (now Szczecin, Poland), where they were held for two weeks without knowing the charges against them. Walter Dornberger and major Hans Georg Klamroth, representative of counterintelligence at Peenemünde, obtained their conditional release so that the V-2 program could continue.

Soviet rocketry program
After World War II, Gröttrup decided to work with the Soviet rocketry program and to continue research as head of the Büro Gröttrup and later Institut Nordhausen and the Zentralwerke Bleicherode which was located in the Soviet Occupation Zone and finally occupied 6,000 employees for the reconstruction and manufacturing of the V-2 rockets. From 9 September 1945 to 22 October 1946, Gröttrup worked under the supervision of Sergei Korolev and Boris Chertok who reported to the Soviet military government of Dmitry Ustinov, the Minister of Armaments. Together with Kurt Magnus, Gröttrup improved the design of the control system based on gyroscope for the inertial navigation system.

Then during the night on 22 October 1946, a selected group of around 200 German scientists and engineers - plus equipment - from the Zentralwerke were unexpectedly and forcibly (at gunpoint) moved to the USSR by 92 trains as part of Operation Osoaviakhim with more than 2,300 German specialists including other domains of German technology. From 1946–1950, Gröttrup headed the more than 170 German specialists working in Podlipki in the north east section of Moscow as part of Korolev's NII-88 and in Branch 1 of NII-88 on Gorodomlya Island in Lake Seliger. The German team was indirectly overseen by Sergei Korolev, the "chief designer" of the Soviet rocketry program.

Gröttrup helped Korolev with the R-1 project, a recreation of the V-2 missile using Russian manufacturing and materials. At Kapustin Yar, he helped Korolev supervise the launching of 20 rebuilt V-2 rockets and analyzing failure causes. In October 1947 they succeeded for the first time. As a reality check on Korolev's missile proposals, official Dmitriy Ustinov asked Gröttrup and his small team to design several new missile systems, including the R-10 (G-1), R-12 (G-2) and the R-14 (G-4) which was similar to the A9/A10 long range missile von Braun designed during the war. None of these projects went beyond the design stage. However, the theoretical work of the German scientists proposed improved solutions due to lack of material, and new ideas significantly contributed to the later success of Soviet space program. Some ideas were incorporated in the R-2 and R-5 missile systems. The launcher for Sputnik 1's orbital flight in October 1957 was based on R-7 Semyorka with a bundling (packeting) of a total of 20 A4-like engines with conical rocket bodies, as already proposed by the German scientists in 1949 in Gorodomlja. For political reasons, however, the contributions made by the German collective of rocket scientists to Soviet missile development have long been considered insignificant by the public in East and West.

Return to Germany
For security reasons, German specialists were not allowed to work on important missile technologies after 1951, but they were kept in the USSR for a 1.5 year "cooling off" period so they could not give timely information to British Intelligence or American Intelligence. Fritz Karl Preikschat, who managed the high frequency lab under Gröttrup from 1946-1952 on Gorodomlya Island, was released in June 1952, made it to West Germany, and briefed the U.S. Air Force on the Soviet rocketry program.

Gröttrup and a few other German scientists were kept longer, based on their positions and the concern that they would move to West Germany. Gröttrup and his family returned to East Germany on 22 November 1953, among the last group from Gorodomlya Island, and, within two weeks, escaped to Cologne in West Germany with the support of British and American Intelligence. His knowledge and assumptions pointed to significant achievements of the Soviet rocketry with a strong focus on much higher payload and reach which Korolev eventually demonstrated with successfully launching the Sputnik 1 satellite to orbit in November 1957.

Invention of the smart card
From 1954 to 1958, Gröttrup worked for Standard Elektrik Lorenz in Pforzheim. He participated in developing the ER56, the first fully transistorized data processing system in Germany. With this, he installed one of the first commercial applications of data processing for managing the logistics of Quelle's mail-order business. In 1956, he and the German informatician Karl Steinbuch coined the word Informatik when they developed the Informatik-Anlage for Quelle's mail-order management, one of the earliest commercial applications of data processing. In 1959, he joined the Produktograph company of Joseph Mayr, which was later taken over by Siemens & Halske, for production data acquisition and monitoring. In 1965, he formed a company called DATEGE in the data processing industry. In February 1966, he filed the patent application "Identification Switch" for releasing a tapping process at a petrol station. In 1967 he developed the principles of the smart card within the German patent application DE1574074 as an Unforgeable Identification Switch. He continued his ideas together with Jürgen Dethloff as a financial investor and, in 1968 and 1969, they filed several patents which were granted later-on, such as US3678250, GB1317915, GB1318850.

Banknote processing
In 1970, Giesecke & Devrient (G&D) took over DATEGE and founded the Gesellschaft für Automation und Organisation (GAO). Gröttrup was managing director in charge of developing machine-readable security features to prevent counterfeit money together with half- and fully automated banknote processing systems (such as ISS 300 and ISS/BPS 3000). The Banknote Processing division (since April 2018 G+D Currency Technology) has become the world market leader for banknote processing equipment since the mid-1990s and has developed single note inspection systems for banknote printing companies. In 1979, G&D presented the first smart card which later became the basic product of G+D Mobile Security. Gröttrup retired in 1980.

Publications

See also
German influence on the Soviet space program
V-2 rocket
Space Race
Soviet space program
Soviet rocketry
Smart card

References

Further reading

External links
History of Gorodomlya Island
Grottrup @ Astronautix.com

1916 births
1981 deaths
German rocket scientists
German aerospace engineers
German spaceflight pioneers
Soviet spaceflight pioneers
Engineers from Cologne
V-weapons people
20th-century German inventors
Smart cards
German expatriates in the Soviet Union